Čihrdād nask is one of the lost nasks (books) of the Avesta and survives only as a summary preserved in Dēnkard 8.13.

In the summary, the text is said to have been a history of mankind from the beginning down to the revelation of Zoroaster, and it was an important source for later works like the Šāhnāmeh of Ferdowsi.

References

External links
The Denkard's description of the Čihrdād nask.

Zoroastrian texts
Lost documents